The Thelephoraceae are a family of fungi in the order Thelephorales. This grouping of mushrooms is commonly known as the "leathery earthfans".

Genera
The family includes the following eight genera:

 Amaurodon
 Hypochnus
 Lenzitopsis
 Polyozellus
 Pseudotomentella
 Skepperia
 Thelephora
 Tomentella

References

External links
 
 

Thelephorales
Basidiomycota families
Taxa named by François Fulgis Chevallier
Taxa described in 1826